Dusmareb Airport  also known as Ugaas Noor Airport or Ugaas Nuur Airport is an airport serving Dusmareb, the capital city of Galmudug state and the central Galguduud region of Somalia.

See also
Transport in Somalia

References                

Airports in Somalia
Dusmareb